San Andrés Nuxiño  is a town and municipality in Oaxaca in south-western Mexico. The municipality covers an area of 84.2 km². It is part of the Nochixtlán District in the southeast of the Mixteca Region.

In 2005, the municipality had a total population of 1983.

References

Municipalities of Oaxaca